In mathematics, the Meyer signature cocycle,  introduced by . is an integer-valued  2-cocyle on a symplectic group that describes the signature of a fiber bundle whose base and fiber are both Riemann surfaces.

References

Manifolds